The discography of South African DJ duo Pascal & Pearce includes three studio albums, three compilation albums, and eight charting singles. It also features numerous other remixes, releases and compilation features.

Albums

Studio albums

Compilation albums

Singles

Charted singles

Other singles

Remixes

Compilation features

Album features

References

External links
 Official website

Discographies of South African artists